Kenneth Williams: Fantabulosa! is a 2006 BBC Four television play starring Michael Sheen as the English comic actor Kenneth Williams, based on Williams' own diaries. Cheryl Campbell plays Williams's mother, Lou.

Michael Sheen performed extensive research for the role, watching archive footage and reading books. He also followed the cabbage soup diet to lose  to play Williams.

The drama received good reviews, with The Observer singling out Sheen's performance as "a characterisation for which the description tour-de-force is, frankly, pretty faint praise". The Times compared Sheen's performance to "a diamond that is so dazzling as a result of the expertise deployed in its cutting that you can’t fully focus on the underlying shape of the stone, which is what actually enables it to glitter so spectacularly."

Viewing figures were 860,000 for its original airing, including timeshift, making it by far the most popular BBC Four broadcast of March 2006. Its repeat showing on 17 March 2006 garnered another 252,000 viewers.

Sheen's performance won a Royal Television Society award for Best Male Actor, and the play also won two BAFTA nominations (best single play and best actor, Michael Sheen).

It was released on DVD as Fantabulosa! – The Kenneth Williams Story in October 2009, and has been rebroadcast several times in the UK since its original airing.

Cast
 Michael Sheen – Kenneth Williams
 Cheryl Campbell – Lou Williams
 Peter Wight – Charlie Williams
 Beatie Edney – Joan Sims
 Kenny Doughty – Joe Orton
 Ron Cook – Peter Eade
 Martin Trenaman – Tony Hancock
 David Charles – Charles Hawtrey
 Ewan Bailey – Kenneth Halliwell
 Rachel Clarke – Barbara Windsor
 Connor Garnett Comerford – Young Kenneth Williams
 Beatrice Comins – St Joan/Actress
 Timothy Davies – 1st Doctor
 Stephen Critchlow – Kenneth Horne
 Guy Henry – Hugh Paddick
 Ged McKenna – Sid James
 Nicholas Parsons – Himself

See also
 The Curse of Steptoe
 Prick Up Your Ears

References

External links

2006 television films
2006 films
BBC television dramas
Biographical films about actors
British LGBT-related television films
Television series produced at Pinewood Studios
2000s British films